Rev. Joseph "Daddy" Dunn (1746–1827) was an English priest and entrepreneur who was noted for his importing and distribution of gas throughout the United Kingdom, mainly the Preston area. Dunn rapidly changed the whole of Lancashire by transporting coal-gas lighting into the area.

Business career
Through being a Jesuit priest, he had many contacts all over the country, as well as some abroad, it was through these contacts that he was informed about business people who could give him the methods to import gas to the Preston area.

Improved Lighting
Through chemical experiments, he had formulated a better gas lighting technique, for longer power and brightness and in 1816, he had enough confidence in himself and his idea to start the Preston Gaslight Company.

Business Success
By the mid-1820s, due to his company, Preston became the second town in England after London to be fully lit by coal gas. His company offices were situated in Avenham.

References

1827 deaths
1746 births
18th-century English businesspeople
18th-century English Jesuits
19th-century English businesspeople
19th-century English Jesuits
English industrialists
Clergy from Preston, Lancashire
People of the Industrial Revolution
Businesspeople from Preston, Lancashire
Engineers from Preston, Lancashire